Ministry for State Security or Ministry of State Security (often abbreviated to MSS) may refer to:

Ministry of State Security (China)
Ministry of State Security (North Korea)
Ministry for State Security (East Germany), more commonly known as the Stasi
Ministry for State Security (Soviet Union)
Ministry of State Security (Transnistria)
Security Service of the Ministry of Internal Affairs (Poland)
Ministry of State Security (Luhansk People's Republic)
Ministry of State Security (Donetsk People's Republic)

Similar agencies
 South African Bureau of State Security
 State Security Agency of the Republic of Belarus
 Committee for State Security in the People's Republic of Bulgaria
 KGB (Committee for State Security), in the Soviet Union
 Sigurimi (Directorate of State Security) in the Socialist People's Republic of Albania
 Main Directorate of State Security in the Soviet Union
 People's Commissariat for State Security (Soviet Union)
 State Security Council in South Africa
 Securitate (State Security Department) in Communist Romania
 UDBA (State Security Directorate) in the Socialist Federal Republic of Yugoslavia
 State Security Intelligence in Egypt
 Belgian State Security Service
 State Security Service Nigeria
 Reich Security Main Office (Nazi Germany)

See also
 Interior ministry
 Ministry of Public Security (disambiguation)

National security institutions